Evan L. "Curly" Hultman (born July 15, 1925) is an American politician and attorney in the state of Iowa. He served as Attorney General of Iowa from 1961 to 1965, as a Republican. He is a retired major general in the United States Army Reserve and served in the Army during World War II. He attended the University of Iowa, earning a B.A. in 1949, and J.D. in 1952.

References

1925 births
American people of Swedish descent
Living people
People from Albia, Iowa
University of Iowa alumni
Iowa Attorneys General
Iowa Republicans
United States Army generals
United States Army personnel of World War II
United States Army reservists
Military personnel from Iowa